Year 154 (CLIV) was a common year starting on Monday (link will display the full calendar) of the Julian calendar. At the time, it was known as the Year of the Consulship of Aurelius and Lateranus (or, less frequently, year 907 Ab urbe condita). The denomination 154 for this year has been used since the early medieval period, when the Anno Domini calendar era became the prevalent method in Europe for naming years.

Events 
 By place 

 Roman Empire 
 King Eupator of Bosphorus pays tribute to Rome, due to the threat posed by the Alani.
 The Antonine Wall is completed.

 Asia 
 Last (2nd) year of Yongxing era of the Chinese Han Dynasty.
 Adalla becomes ruler of the Korean kingdom of Silla.

 By topic 
 Religion 
 Anicetus becomes pope of Rome (approximate date).
 Anicetus meets with Polycarp of Smyrna to discuss the Computus, the date of Easter in the Christian liturgical calendar. 
 Change of Patriarch of Constantinople from Patriarch Euzois to Patriarch Laurence.

Births 
 July 11 – Bardaisan, Syriac gnostic (d. 222)

Deaths 
 Euzois, bishop of Byzantium
 Ilseong, Korean ruler of Silla
 Pius I, pope of Rome (approximate date)

References